Ladu Ram (born 20 December 1942) is an Indian politician from the Bharatiya Janata Party he was a member of the Rajasthan Legislative Assembly representing the Gudamalani Vidhan Sabha constituency of Rajasthan.

References 

Bharatiya Janata Party politicians from Rajasthan
1942 births
Living people